Adaskin is a surname. Notable people with the surname include:

 Frances Adaskin (1900–2001), Canadian pianist
 Harry Adaskin (1901–1994), Canadian violinist, academic, and radio broadcaster
 Murray Adaskin (1906–2002), Canadian violinist, composer, conductor, and teacher